The 2024 Tulsa mayoral election is scheduled for August 27, 2024 to elect the mayor of Tulsa, Oklahoma. Two-term incumbent mayor G. T. Bynum is term-limited and cannot seek re-election to a third term in office. A runoff, if necessary, will be held November 5, 2024. The official candidate filing period is in June 2024.

Candidates

Publicly expressed interest
 Carol Bush, former state representative for the 70th district (2016–2022) (Republican)
 Jayme Fowler, city councilor for the 9th district (2020–present)
 Karen Keith, Tulsa County commissioner for the 2nd district (2008–present) (Democratic)
 Phil Lakin, city councilor for the 8th district (2011–present)
 Monroe Nichols, state representative for the 72nd district (2016–present) (Democratic)
 John O'Connor, former acting Attorney General of Oklahoma (2021–2023) (Republican)
 David Rader, state senator for the 39th district (2016–present) (Republican)

References

Tulsa
Tulsa
2024